Ariyalur is a legislative assembly, that includes the city, Ariyalur. Its State Assembly Constituency number is 149. Until 2006, Ariyalur assembly constituency was part of Perambalur Lok Sabha constituency. After 2006, it is a part of Chidambaram Lok Sabha constituency. It is one of the 234 State Legislative Assembly Constituencies in Tamil Nadu, in India.

History
From the 1977 elections, the assembly seat was won by Dravida Munnetra Kazhagam (DMK) three times during the 1977, 1980 and 1989 elections, the All India Anna Dravida Munnetra Kazhagam (AIADMK) two times during the 2001 and 2011 elections, Indian National Congress once during 2006 and Tamil Maanila Congress once during the 1996 elections. In 2016 Member of Legislative Assembly (MLA) of the constituency was Thamarai S.Rajendran from the AIADMK Party. The current MLA since 2021 is K. Chinnappa from DMK.

Madras State

Tamil Nadu

Election results

2021

2016

2011

2006

2001

1996

1991

1989

1984

1980

1977

1971

1967

1962

1957

1952

Notes

References 
 

Assembly constituencies of Tamil Nadu
Ariyalur district